The Lego Star Wars Holiday Special is a 2020 animated Christmas special based on the Star Wars franchise, in which Rey trains Finn in the ways of the force. Directed by Ken Cunningham from a script by David Shayne, it is produced by Lucasfilm Animation and The Lego Group alongside Atomic Cartoons. The special was released on Disney+ on November 17, 2020 and received generally positive reviews from critics.

Plot 
On the first Life Day after the defeat of the First Order, Rey trains Finn to be a Jedi, but becomes angry with herself for their lack of progress. While reading the ancient Jedi texts for help, Rey finds about a key on the planet Kordoku that she deduces could help her train Finn. With the key only being useable on Life Day, Rey and BB-8 leave for Kordoku, while the rest stay on the planet Kashyyyk, where Poe Dameron unsuccessfully tries to set-up a Life Day party for Chewbacca's family.

On Kordoku, Rey finds the "key", which she discovers is a crystal capable of time travel to previous Life Days via a portal. She uses the crystal to observe former Jedi masters and students, until she and BB-8 accidentally end-up on Emperor Palpatine's chambers inside the second Death Star. After overhearing them and discovering the portal, Palpatine orders Darth Vader to follow them. Rey and Vader end up in a duel across time that ends with them and multiple parties througth time clashing on the Lars family farm shortly before Luke Skywalker's departure. After being transported back to Kordoku, Vader steals the crystal and strands Rey and young Luke in the planet.

After handling the crystal to Palpatine, the two use it to travel into the future, ending up in Kylo Ren's chambers shortly after he named himself Supreme Leader of the First Order. There, Ren informs them how Vader betrays and kills Palpatine. Unaware of his secret survival, the duo then travel back to the Death Star alongside Ren, with Palpatine planning to kill Vader before his betrayal and turn Ren into his new apprentice.

On Kordoku, Yoda's Force spirit shows Rey how, in her frustration, she became cold towards Finn, and that she needs to treat him as both a student and friend. With help from Yoda and Luke, Rey creates a new portal and returns to the second Death Star. Rey and the Luke from that era face against Ren and Vader, before Rey retakes the crystal and reluctantly returns Ren to his time. Luke and Rey defeat Palpatine, who is thrown into the reactor shaft by Vader, as in the original timeline, due to his mistreatment after learning of their fates.

Rey returns the young Luke to the past and restores the timeline, before returning to Kordoku in the present and returning the key. She then returns to Kashyyyk and joins the party, which Finn and Rose Tico managed to save by contacting their allies for help. Rey apologizes to Finn, and tells him she is ready to train him as her Padawan.

Voice cast

Production

Development 
The Lego Star Wars Holiday Special was announced to be in development in August 2020. The special serves as an homage and satire to the infamous The Star Wars Holiday Special (1980). The concept for the special was conceived by director Ken Cunningham when he was requested by The Lego Group and Lucasfilm Animation to help develop content based on the Star Wars franchise. Lucasfilm wanted to expand their Lego productions since they began to develop projects for Disney+. After a reunion between the executives where they reminisced of holiday specials they watched in their childhoods, they decided to develop a holiday special based on Lego Star Wars.

Writing 
The writers drew inspiration from several Christmas specials, such as Rudolph the Red-Nosed Reindeer and Planes, Trains and Automobiles, as they felt their storytelling and lessons about family were "inherent" to the Star Wars franchise, and choose to explore Rey's burden as the last Jedi and how that isolates her from her friends. The producers ultimately conceived a time-travel plot that allows Rey to reflect "on her own mistakes, her own teachings, and what it means to be a mentor"; according to executive producer James Waugh, the concept of a time-travel story through several Star Wars projects was inspired by how children do not regulate themselves with a particular era while playing with their Lego Star Wars sets.

Though the original Holiday Special served as an inspiration for the writers, they did not want it to be a remake, instead creating an original story while "honoring" certain elements from the original special that were canonized in other Star Wars media, most prominently the Life Day. The writers gave the character of Rose Tico a prominent role in the story after her reduced role in Star Wars: The Rise of Skywalker (2019).

Casting 
Voice actors from previous Star Wars media who reprise their roles in the special include Billy Dee Williams, Kelly Marie Tran, Anthony Daniels, Matt Lanter, Tom Kane, James Arnold Taylor, and Dee Bradley Baker. According to Mark Hamill, he was not approached to voice his longtime Star Wars role as Luke Skywalker in the special; the character was instead voiced by Eric Bauza.

Animation 
Approximately 100 animators from Atomic Cartoons worked on the special. According to director Ken Cunnigham, the animators wanted the special to have as much of a cinematic quality as possible, having been inspired by the videogame Lego Star Wars: The Skywalker Saga. The animators used the LEGO Digital Designer to build models through digital Lego bricks, before being brought to Atomic Cartoons' computer software to work on the animation.

Release 
The Lego Star Wars Holiday Special was released in November 17, 2020, on Disney+, marking the 42nd anniversary of the original Holiday Special's release.

Marketing 
The special's official trailer was released on November 5, 2020. To promote the special, the producers worked closely with Lego to create tie-in sets that were released as part of the "LEGO Star Wars Advent Calendar".

Reception 
On the review aggregator website Rotten Tomatoes the special has an approval rating of 75%, based on 59 reviews, with an average rating of 7.4 out of 10. The site's critics consensus reads: "The Force isn't fully with this Lego Star Wars adventure, but its affectionate franchise callbacks and self-aware humor should please fans looking to spend their holidays in a galaxy far, far away". On Metacritic, the special has a weighted average score of 65 out of 100, based on 9 critics, indicating "generally favorable reviews".

Will Thorne of Variety wrote: "At the end of the (Life) day, The Lego Star Wars Holiday Special is a fun, self-contained adventure which feels a few bricks short of a full Star Wars load."
The A.V. Club gave it a B- grade, comparing it to the Star Wars Holiday Special saying it "amps up that cheesiness in the best way possible, taking all the bad with the good, in a charming ode to the 1978 television special."
DiscussingFilm rated it 3 out of 5
Ben Travis of Empire magazine rated it 4 out of 5.
IGN rated it 7 out of 10, calling it "all at once abundantly silly, cringingly corny, and marvelously meta."
IndieWire gave it an A- grade.

Notes

References

External links 
 

Lego Star Wars films